Friendship Christian School can refer to the following schools in the United States:

Friendship Christian School (Georgia) in Suwanee, Georgia
Friendship Christian School (Hawaii) in Ewa Beach, Hawaii
Friendship Christian School (North Carolina) in Raleigh, North Carolina
Friendship Christian School (Tennessee) in Lebanon, Tennessee